Neghmat Rakhman (born 17 April 1983) is a Chinese television host of Uyghur ethnicity, currently working for state broadcaster CCTV. He is noted for hosting SuperStar DingDong and Sing My Song. He has also been a host on the CCTV New Year's Gala since 2015.

Life
Rakhman was born and raised in Ürümqi, Xinjiang, the son of Rizwan, an actress at Xinjiang Song and Dance Troupe and Mahmut, an editor at Xinjiang People's Publishing House. In 2006, he graduated from Communication University of China, majoring in broadcasting.

In 2006, Rakhman hosted Quiz Show with Wang Xiaoya in CCTV-2. Then he hosted Everyone! Ready? Let's go! with Fang Qiong.

In January 2012, he became host of the show The Echo is Loud with Li Sisi.

Rakhman hosted SuperStar DingDong since January 1, 2013. He also hosts Sing My Song, a Chinese reality talent show. In 2015, he became one of the hosts of the CCTV New Year's Gala. He returned to host the event again in 2016.

Personal life
On September 28, 2013, Negmat Rahman married Pashagul Durqun in Ürümqi.

References

External links

1983 births
People from Ürümqi
Living people
CCTV television presenters
Communication University of China alumni
Uyghur people
Hosts of the CCTV New Year's Gala